The Stevens–Bruxner ministry (1935–1938) or Second Stevens–Bruxner ministry or Second Stevens ministry was the 47th ministry of the New South Wales Government, and was led by the 25th Premier, Bertram Stevens, in a United Australia Party coalition with the Country Party, that was led by Michael Bruxner. The ministry was the second one of three occasions when the Government was led by Stevens, as Premier; and second of four occasions where Bruxner served as Deputy Premier.

Stevens was first elected to the New South Wales Legislative Assembly in 1927 and served continuously until 1940. Having served as a senior minister in the Bavin ministry, following the defeat of the Nationalist coalition led by Bavin, who was in poor health, at the 1930 state election, Stevens was elected leader of the newly formed United Australia Party (UAP) in New South Wales and became Leader of the Opposition. Bruxner was first elected to the Assembly in 1920 and served continuously until 1962. Initially a member of the Progressive Party, he served as party leader in opposition between 1922 and 1925; and resumed leadership in 1932, following the resignation of his successor, Ernest Buttenshaw. By this stage, the party was renamed as the Country Party.

The Stevens–Bruxner coalition came to power as a result of the Lang Dismissal Crisis, when the Governor of New South Wales, Philip Game used the reserve power of The Crown to remove Jack Lang as Premier, asking Stevens to form government. Going to the polls a month later, Stevens/Bruxner won a landslide victory at the 1932 state election and were re-elected at the 1935 state election, albeit with a reduced margin. The principal change from the first Stevens–Bruxner ministry was that Reginald Weaver, the Deputy leader of the United Australia Party, was dropped from the ministry, with Stevens describing him as "too extreme in personal independence" and possessing a "needlessly sharp tongue", replaced by the promotion of Herbert FitzSimons. There were five by-elections during the ministry, with the government losing three of them.

This ministry covers the period from 11 February 1935 until 13 April 1938 when the 1938 state election saw the Stevens–Bruxner coalition re-elected for a subsequent and third term.

Composition of ministry
The composition of the ministry was announced by Premier Stevens on 11 February 1935.

 
Ministers are members of the Legislative Assembly unless otherwise noted.

See also

First Stevens–Bruxner ministry
Third Stevens–Bruxner ministry
Members of the New South Wales Legislative Assembly, 1935-1938
Members of the New South Wales Legislative Council, 1934-1937
Members of the New South Wales Legislative Council, 1937-1940

References

 

! colspan="3" style="border-top: 5px solid #cccccc" | New South Wales government ministries

New South Wales ministries
1935 establishments in Australia
1938 disestablishments in Australia